Tuxentius calice, the white pie, is a butterfly of the family Lycaenidae. It is found in Africa southwards of the equator.

The wingspan is 21–24 mm for males and 21–25 mm for females. Adults are on wing year-round, but are most common from October to March.

The larvae feed on Ziziphus mucronata and probably other Ziziphus species.

Subspecies
Tuxentius calice calice — South Africa, Zimbabwe, Mozambique, Botswana, Zambia, southern Zaire (Shaba), Angola, Malawi, southern Tanzania
Tuxentius calice gregorii (Butler, 1894) — northern Tanzania, central Kenya

References

Butterflies described in 1855
Polyommatini